Meton granulicollis is a species of beetle in the family Cerambycidae. It was described by Pascoe in 1859. It is known from Moluccas.

Subspecies
 Meton granulicollis granulicollis Pascoe, 1859
 Meton granulicollis tenimberensis Breuning, 1965

References

Desmiphorini
Beetles described in 1859